Tim Dillon may refer to:

 Tim Dillon (comedian) (born 1985), American stand-up comedian and podcaster
 Tim Dillon (athletic director), American athletic director
 Tim Dillon (candidate), American political candidate from Washington
 Tim Dillon (All My Children), a fictional character from All My Children